Bolshaya Doshchinka is a rural locality (a khutor) in Perelazovskoye Rural Settlement, Kletsky District, Volgograd Oblast, Russia. The population was 50 as of 2010. There are 3 streets.

Geography 
Bolshaya Doshchinka is located on the Donshchinka River, 55 km southwest of Kletskaya (the district's administrative centre) by road. Malaya Donshchinka is the nearest rural locality.

References 

Rural localities in Kletsky District